William Gay Brown Jr. (April 7, 1856 – March 9, 1916) was a lawyer, and Democratic politician from West Virginia who served as a United States representative. Congressman Brown was born in Kingwood, West Virginia in  Preston County (then in Virginia) on April 7, 1856. He served as a member of the  62nd, 63rd, and 64th United States Congresses. He died in office on March 9, 1916.

Early life
Brown was the only child born to lawyer and former Congressman William G. Brown Sr., and his second wife, Margaret Gay Brown (d. 1913), who survived her husband by nearly two decades and was close to her son. This father was a leading Unionist during the American Civil War, sometimes called the  "Father of West Virginia", and would be the first Congressman elected to West Virginia's 2nd Congressional district when the state was formed.

Career
William Jr. graduated from West Virginia University at Morgantown in 1877, where he was a member of Phi Sigma Kappa fraternity. The same year, he was admitted to the bar and opened his law practice in Preston County. Like his father, he also worked in banking. His father died in 1884, leaving a substantial estate. In 1896, young Brown lost his first bid to become a congressman. In 1910, voters elected Brown as a Democrat to the Sixty-second Congress. He was re-elected to the Sixty-third and Sixty-fourth Congresses. He served from March 4, 1911, until his death in Washington, D.C. on March 9, 1916. Congressman Brown was buried in the family plot at Kingwood Cemetery in Kingwood, West Virginia.

Personal life
Brown married three times. His first marriage was in 1883 to Jessie Thomas, of Tyrone, Pennsylvania, who died three years later near the birth of their daughter Jessie. His second wife, Flora B. Martin, a West Virginia native, fell victim to pneumonia in 1912 afters about ten years of marriage. His third wife, actress and women's rights activist Izetta Jewel Kenney, whom he married in December 1914, gave birth to their daughter Izetta Jewel Gay Brown just a few weeks before Brown died in office in March, 1916.

See also
United States congressional delegations from West Virginia
List of United States Congress members who died in office (1900–49)

References

External links

1856 births
1916 deaths
People from Kingwood, West Virginia
American people of Scottish descent
Democratic Party members of the United States House of Representatives from West Virginia
West Virginia lawyers
19th-century American politicians
19th-century American lawyers
20th-century American lawyers
West Virginia University alumni